Grammotaulius is a genus of caddisflies belonging to the family Limnephilidae.

The species of this genus are found in Europe and Northern America.

Species:
 Grammotaulius alascensis Schmid, 1964 
 Grammotaulius bettenii Hill-Griffin, 1912

References

Limnephilidae
Insects of Europe
Insects of North America
Trichoptera genera